Chiara Consolini (born 20 May 1988) is an Italian basketball player. She competed in the 2020 Summer Olympics.

References

External links
 
 
 
 
 

1988 births
Living people
3x3 basketball players at the 2020 Summer Olympics
Italian women's 3x3 basketball players
Italian women's basketball players
Olympic 3x3 basketball players of Italy
Sportspeople from the Province of Verona